Xalisco is a city and its surrounding municipality of the same name in the Mexican state of Nayarit. The city had a population of 21,899 in the 2005 census while the municipality has an area of 290.6 km² (112.2 sq mi) and a population of 42,893. The municipality lies adjacent to the south side of Tepic, the state capital, and is part of the Tepic metropolitan area.

Formerly known as Jalisco, this municipality is located 6.4 km. southwest of Tepic.  In the north it bounds the municipality of Tepic,  in the south the municipality of Compostela; in the east the municipality of Santiago Ixcuintla and in the west the municipality of San Blas. The total area is 290.60 square kilometers, which makes it the smallest of the 20 municipalities that make up the state.

Over half of the municipal territory is mountainous with one peak, Cerro Alto, reaching 2,240 meters.  There are several small rivers and streams of short length.

In the upper elevations there are still conifers and oaks, but over-forestry and long years of wood gathering for cooking have seriously depleted the natural cover.  There are still deer, badgers, armadillos, and javelinas in more remote locations.

Due to the proximity to Tepic the economy is less agriculturally based than many municipalities in the state.  
Among the most important crops were: rice, corn, avocados, lemons, oranges, bananas, coffee, cherries, and sugarcane.

In the town there are the ruins of a colonial hacienda and a museum with pre-Columbian artifacts.  The most important festival is that of  Asunción de la Virgen María, celebrated on 15 August, at the beginning of the corn harvest.  It is also known as the “La Feria del Elote”, or Corn Fair.

Opium and Black Tar Heroin
The area produces opium poppies which are tapped for gum which is processed into black tar heroin and smuggled into the United States. Several hundred immigrants from Xalisco, part of a larger number still involved in retail heroin distribution, are incarcerated in the United States.

Toponymy
The origin of the name Xalisco comes from the Nahuatl Xalixko: "xal-li" (sand), "ix-telotl" (eye) and ko (place); Place of the sandy eye.

Sister cities
Xalisco has one sister city, as designated by Sister Cities International:

 Taos, New Mexico, U.S.

Government

Municipal presidents

References

Sources
L.A. Times: Xalisco heroin trade part 1
L.A. Times: Xalisco heroin trade part 2
L.A. Times: Xalisco heroin trade part 3
Quinones, S. (2015). Dreamland: The True Tale of America's Opiate Epidemic. New York, NY: Bloomsbury Press.

External links
Ayuntamiento de Xalisco Official website

Populated places in Nayarit
Municipalities of Nayarit